Voggenreiter is a German music publishing house.

History 
In 1919, Ludwig Voggenreiter and  established the publishing house Der Weiße Ritter (The White Knight) in Potsdam. When Habbel left the company in 1924 it was renamed Ludwig Voggenreiter Verlag. The program comprised mainly song- and logbooks as well as books for adolescents and fiction. After Voggenreiters death in 1947, his brother Heinrich continued the company, publishing bestselling songbooks such as Der Turm and Der Kilometerstein. Two years later the company moved to Bad Godesberg and was renamed Voggenreiter Verlag.

In 1967 Ernst Rüdiger Voggenreiter, Heinrich Voggenreiters son, founded the Xenophon record label which published songs by Reinhard Mey and Hannes Wader, and other musicians. In the 1970s and 1980s, the company began the production of music books for autodidacts, one notable book being the guitar book by Peter Bursch.

After the death of Ernst Voggenreiter, his sons Charles and Ralph took over. They introduced musical instruments, CDs and DVDs to the companies portfolio.

In May 2017, Voggenreiter moved from Bonn to Wachtberg.

Products 
Voggenreiter publishes music literature, textbooks for various instruments and songbooks in print and electronic form. It is complemented by musical instruments for beginners. "Voggy's Kinderwelt" is aimed at pre-school and primary school children with books and instrument sets. Instruments such as recorder, harmonica, glockenspiel and other percussion instruments are available.

References

External links
 

Music publishing companies of Germany
Sheet music publishing companies
Publishing companies established in 1919
Companies based in North Rhine-Westphalia
1919 establishments in Germany